Joel Tillema (born 5 September 1989) is a Dutch footballer who plays for AFC in the Tweede Divisie.

Career
Tillema started playing football at amateur club in his hometown of The Hague before moving to RVC Rijswijk, where he was noticed by talent scouts of Ajax. He ended up in the youth academy of the Amsterdam-based club, but after some time returned to his hometown to play in the youth academy of ADO Den Haag. He made his professional debut on 24 October 2008 as a starter in the 3–1 away match against Heracles Almelo after Ahmed Ammi was forced on the sideline after falling out injured in the warm-up. In the end, Tillema made no more than four appearances in three seasons for ADO Den Haag. 

In the summer of 2011, Tillema left for Hoofdklasse club SVV Scheveningen, after which Tillema would also play for SV Spakenburg and Rijnsburgse Boys. In December 2019, it was announced that Tillema would join AFC for the 2020–21 season.

References

External links
 Player profile at Voetbal International

1989 births
Footballers from The Hague
Living people
Dutch footballers
ADO Den Haag players
SVV Scheveningen players
SV Spakenburg players
Rijnsburgse Boys players
Eredivisie players
Tweede Divisie players
Derde Divisie players
Haaglandia players
AFC Ajax players
Amsterdamsche FC players
Association football midfielders